The 2006 OFC Club Championship was the 5th edition of the top-level Oceanic club football tournament organized by the Oceania Football Confederation (OFC), and the last tournament before it was rebranded as the OFC Champions League. The qualifying round was held at Govind Park in Ba, Fiji, from 6 February until 10 February 2006, with the main competition taking place at the North Harbour Stadium in Albany, New Zealand from 10 May until 21 May 2006.

The tournament was the first of its kind to not have a representative from Australia competing, due to the nation's migration to the Asian Football Confederation, meaning the winners of the competition would for the first time be from a nation outside of Australia.

Australia's departure from the OFC meant that qualification for the 2006 FIFA Club World Cup was under question – in March 2006 it was reported that the Oceania champions would have to play a preliminary match against the J. League champions for a place in the main competition. However, later that month, it was announced that FIFA president Sepp Blatter had been unable to get the necessary support for the new format and as a result Oceania retained direct entry to 2006 FIFA Club World Cup. FIFA reviewed the format the following year.

The winner of the tournament was Auckland City of New Zealand, who beat AS Pirae of Tahiti in the final.

Participants

The following teams entered the competition.

Notes

Preliminary round
A preliminary round was held to determine the 8th and final participant in the final. The format was a group stage, with each team playing each other once. The winner of the group would qualify for the main draw.

First round
The eight remaining teams were separated into two groups, each team playing the other teams once. The top two teams from each group progress to the semi-finals. This First Round was held in Albany, New Zealand.

Group A

Group B

Knockout stage

Semi finals
The top two teams from both groups progressed to the semifinals.

Third Place Playoff

Final

Auckland City are the 2006 Oceania Club Champions and qualify for the 2006 FIFA Club World Cup.

See also
Oceania Club Championship

References

External links
 RSSSF archive of the 2006 Oceania Club Championship
 Oceania Football OFC Event Report

2006
1
2006
OFC
2006 in Fiji